This is a list of Spanish television related events from 2018.

Events
 25 April - À Punt, regional public television in the Valencian Community is launched.
 27 July - Rosa María Mateo is appointed Provisional Sole Administrator of RTVE.
 31 July -José Antonio Álvarez Gundín is replaced by Begoña Alegría as Head of the News Department in RTVE.

Debuts

Television shows

Ending this year

Deaths
 9 January - Maruja Callaved, hostess and director, 89.
 17 January - Ramón Pradera, director.
 22 February - Antonio Fraguas Forges, cartoonist, 76.
 20 April - Pedro Erquicia, journalist, 75.
 5 May - José María Íñigo, host, 75.
 12 May - Antonio Mercero, director and writer, 82.
 16 August - Marisa Porcel, actress, 74.
 2 November - Álvaro de Luna, actor, 83.
 22 November, José Luis Pellicena, actor, 85.
 30 December - Cesáreo Estébanez, actor, 77.

See also
 2018 in Spain

References